Jalilabad (also Romanized as Jalīlābād) is a village in Kohanabad Rural District, Kohanabad District, Aradan County, Semnan Province, Iran. At the 2006 census, its population was 701, in 202 families.

References 

Populated places in Aradan County